The 2020 Bendigo Spirit season is the 14th season for the franchise in the Women's National Basketball League (WNBL).

Ahead of the 2020 season, the Spirit announced that local property development company, Villawood Properties, would serve as naming rights partners after signing a two-year deal in September 2020. Their leadership team for the season was announced with Tessa Lavey as captain, alongside Carley Ernst and Amelia Todhunter as co-vice captains.

Due to the COVID-19 pandemic, a North Queensland hub is set to host the season. The season was originally 2020–21 and would be traditionally played over several months across the summer, however this seasons scheduling has been condensed. The six-week season will see Townsville, Cairns and Mackay host a 56-game regular season fixture, plus a four-game final series (2 x semi-finals, preliminary final and grand final). Each team will contest 14 games starting on 12 November, with the grand final scheduled for 20 December.

Roster

Standings

Results

Regular season

References

External links
Bendigo Spirit Official website

2020 WNBL season
WNBL seasons by team
Basketball,Bendigo Spirit
2020 in basketball
Australia,Bendigo Spirit
2020–21 in Australian basketball